This is a list of FIPS 10-4 region codes from M-O, using a standardized name format, and cross-linking to articles.

On September 2, 2008, FIPS 10-4 was one of ten standards withdrawn by NIST as a Federal Information Processing Standard. The list here is the last version of codes. For earlier versions, see link below.

MA: Madagascar

MC: Macau

MD: Moldova

MG: Mongolia

MH: Montserrat

MI: Malawi

MK: North Macedonia 

 MK01: Aračinovo Municipality
 MK02: Bač
 MK03: Belčišta
 MK04: Berovo Municipality
 MK05: Bistrica, Bitola
 MK06: Bitola Municipality
 MK07: Blatec Opština, North Macedonia
 MK08: Bogdanci Municipality
 MK09: Bogomila
 MK10: Bogovinje Municipality
 MK11: Bosilovo Municipality
 MK12: Brvenica Municipality
 MK14: Capari
 MK15: Čaška Municipality
 MK16: Čegrane Municipality
 MK19: Češinovo-Obleševo Municipality
 MK20: Čučer-Sandevo Municipality
 MK21: Debar Municipality
 MK22: Delčevo Municipality
 MK23: Delogoždi Opština, North Macedonia
 MK24: Demir Hisar Municipality
 MK25: Demir Kapija Municipality
 MK26: Dobruševo
 MK27: Dolna Banjica
 MK28: Dolneni Municipality
 MK30: Drugovo Municipality
 MK31: Džepčište
 MK33: Gevgelija Municipality
 MK34: Gostivar Municipality
 MK35: Gradsko Municipality
 MK36: Ilinden Municipality
 MK37: Čaška Municipality
 MK38: Jegunovce Municipality
 MK39: Kamenjane
 MK40: Karbinci Municipality
 MK41: Karpoš Municipality
 MK42: Kavadarci Municipality
 MK43: Kičevo Municipality
 MK44: Kisela Voda Municipality
 MK45: Klečevce Opština, North Macedonia
 MK46: Kočani Municipality
 MK47: Konče Municipality
 MK48: Kondovo, Saraj
 MK49: Konopište, North Macedonia
 MK50: Kosel, North Macedonia
 MK51: Kratovo Municipality
 MK52: Kriva Palanka Municipality
 MK53: Krivogaštani Municipality
 MK54: Kruševo Municipality
 MK55: Kukliš
 MK56: Kukurečani
 MK57: Kumanovo Municipality
 MK58: Labuništa
 MK59: Lipkovo Municipality
 MK60: Lozovo Municipality
 MK61: Lukovo, Struga
 MK62: Makedonska Kamenica Municipality
 MK63: Makedonski Brod Municipality
 MK64: Mavrovi Anovi
 MK65: Mešeišta
 MK66: Miravci
 MK67: Mogila Municipality
 MK68: Murtino
 MK69: Negotino Municipality
 MK70: Negotino-Pološko Opština, North Macedonia
 MK71: Novaci Municipality
 MK72: Novo Selo Municipality
 MK73: Češinovo-Obleševo Municipality
 MK74: Ohrid Municipality
 MK75: Orašac, Kumanovo
 MK76: Orizari Opština, North Macedonia
 MK77: Oslomej Municipality
 MK78: Pehčevo Municipality
 MK79: Petrovec Municipality
 MK80: Plasnica Municipality
 MK81: Podareš
 MK82: Prilep Municipality
 MK83: Probištip Municipality
 MK84: Radoviš Municipality
 MK85: Rankovce Municipality
 MK86: Resen Municipality
 MK87: Rosoman Municipality
 MK88: Rostuša
 MK89: Samokov
 MK90: Saraj Municipality
 MK91: Šipkovica
 MK92: Sopište Municipality
 MK93: Sopotnica, Demir Hisar
 MK94: Srbinovo
 MK95: Staravina
 MK96: Star Dojran Municipality
 MK97: Staro Nagoričane Municipality
 MK98: Štip Municipality
 MK99: Struga Municipality
 MKA1: Strumica Municipality
 MKA2: Studeničani Municipality
 MKA3: Šuto Orizari Municipality
 MKA4: Sveti Nikole Municipality
 MKA5: Tearce Municipality
 MKA6: Tetovo Municipality
 MKA7: Topolčani
 MKA8: Valandovo Municipality
 MKA9: Vasilevo Municipality
 MKB1: Veles Municipality
 MKB2: Velešta
 MKB3: Vevčani Municipality
 MKB4: Vinica Municipality, North Macedonia
 MKB5: Vitolište
 MKB6: Vraneštica Municipality
 MKB7: Vrapčište Municipality
 MKB8: Vratnica
 MKB9: Vrutok
 MKC1: Zajas Municipality
 MKC2: Zelenikovo Municipality
 MKC3: Želino Municipality
 MKC4: Žitoše
 MKC5: Zletovo
 MKC6: Zrnovci Municipality

ML: Mali

MO: Morocco

MP: Mauritius

MR: Mauritania

MT: Malta

MU: Oman

MV: Maldives

MX: Mexico

MY: Malaysia

MZ: Mozambique

NG: Niger

NH: Vanuatu

NI: Nigeria

NL: Netherlands

NO: Norway

NP: Nepal

NR: Nauru

NS: Suriname

NU: Nicaragua

NZ: New Zealand 

Note: Tasman Region was not assigned a code for unknown reasons.

See also 
 List of FIPS region codes (A–C)
 List of FIPS region codes (D–F)
 List of FIPS region codes (G–I)
 List of FIPS region codes (J–L)
 List of FIPS region codes (P–R)
 List of FIPS region codes (S–U)
 List of FIPS region codes (V–Z)

Sources 
 FIPS 10-4 Codes and history
 Last version of codes
 All codes (include earlier versions)
 Table to see the evolution of the codes over time
 Administrative Divisions of Countries ("Statoids"), Statoids.com

References 

Region codes